People's African Methodist Episcopal Zion Church is a historic African Methodist Episcopal Zion church located in Downtown Syracuse, Onondaga County, New York. It was designed by architect Charles Erastus Colton and Wallace Rayfield and built in 1911.  It is a small Gothic Revival style stuccoed brick building.  It sits on a cut limestone foundation and measures approximately 25 feet wide and 50 feet deep.  It has a two-story projecting front gable and features a three-story bell tower topped by a pyramidal roof.  The congregation was incorporated in 1837 and remained at this location until 1976.

It was listed on the National Register of Historic Places in 2012.

References 

African Methodist Episcopal churches in New York (state)
1837 establishments in New York (state)
Churches on the National Register of Historic Places in New York (state)
Gothic Revival church buildings in New York (state)
Churches completed in 1911
Churches in Syracuse, New York
National Register of Historic Places in Syracuse, New York